The 2009 IIHF World Women's U18 Championship was the second holding of the World Women's U18 Championships, the premier International Ice Hockey Federation (IIHF) tournament for top division national women's junior ice hockey teams. It was held from 5 January through 10 January 2009, in Füssen, Germany. Eight teams competed in the Top Division tournament. Team USA won the tournament for the second time and the Swiss national U18 team was relegated to Division I.

Top Division

The 2009 IIHF World Women's U18 Championship – Division I was the first holding of an IIHF World Women's U18 Championship for the newly formed Division I. It was held from 28 December 2008 through 2 January 2009, in Chambéry, France. Five teams competed in the Division I tournament. The Japanese national U18 team won the tournament and gained promotion to the Top Division.

Teams
The following teams participated in the championship:

Preliminary round
All times are local (UTC+1).

Group A

Group B

Placement Round

5–8th place semifinals

7th place game

 is relegated to the 2010 IIHF World Women's U18 Championship – Division I.

5th place game

Playoff round

Bracket

Semifinals

Bronze medal game

Final

Final standings

Statistics

Scoring leaders
List shows the top skaters sorted by points, then goals. If the list exceeds 10 skaters because of a tie in points, all of the tied skaters are shown.
GP = Games played; G = Goals; A = Assists; Pts = Points; +/− = Plus/minus; PIM = Penalties in minutes; POS = PositionSource: IIHF

Goaltending leaders
Only the top five goaltenders, based on save percentage, who have played 40% of their team's minutes are included in this list.
TOI = Time On Ice (minutes:seconds); SA = Shots against; GA = Goals against; GAA = Goals against average; Sv% = Save percentage; SO = ShutoutsSource: IIHF

Tournament awards
Best players selected by the directorate:
Best Goaltender:  Alex Rigsby
Best Defenceman:  Alev Kelter
Best Forward:  Amanda Kessel

Division I

The tournament was held in Chambéry, France, from December 28, 2008 to January 2, 2009.

 is promoted to the Top Division for the 2010 IIHF World Women's U18 Championship.

See also
 2009 Women's World Ice Hockey Championships
 2009 IIHF World U18 Championships (Men)
 2009 World Junior Ice Hockey Championships (Men)

References

External links
 Official site of the IIHF

IIHF World Women's U18 Championships
2009 in ice hockey
World
World
2009
January 2009 sports events in Europe
Women's ice hockey in Germany
2009 in German women's sport